Vladimir Petrovich Rzhevsky (born 19 July 1987) is a former Russian footballer.

Career
Rzhevsky played as a defender. On 13 August 2008, Rzhevsky scored the decisive goal for BATE Borisov against Levski Sofia in the Third Round Qualifying for the 2008-09 UEFA Champions League season. Rzhevsky also played in Finland for Jakobstad before he joined BATE in 2008.

Coaching career
Ending his career in 2012 after a series of injuries, Rzhevsky began taking a coaching license. In August 2015, he returned to BATE Borisov as a youth coach. As of June 2019, he was still working for the club.

References

External links
 
 
 Career summary by Sportbox

1987 births
People from Zheleznovodsk
Living people
Russian footballers
Association football defenders
Jakobstads BK players
FC BATE Borisov players
PFC Krylia Sovetov Samara players
Kakkonen players
Belarusian Premier League players
Russian expatriate footballers
Russian expatriate sportspeople in Finland
Russian expatriate sportspeople in Belarus
Expatriate footballers in Finland
Expatriate footballers in Belarus
Sportspeople from Stavropol Krai